Ion Morei (born 13 September 1955) is a Moldovan attorney. He was the Minister of Justice of Moldova in the first cabinet (2001–2005) of Prime Minister Vasile Tarlev. He served from April 19, 2001, until February 12, 2003, when he was replaced as minister by Vasile Dolghieru.

References

Moldovan Ministers of Justice
1955 births
Living people
21st-century Moldovan politicians